Events from the year 1988 in the Socialist Republic of Romania.

Incumbents
President: Nicolae Ceaușescu
Prime Minister: Constantin Dăscălescu

Events

January
8 January:
 President Nicolae Ceaușescu receives US senator Arlen Specter.
 Romania confirms its participation at the 1988 Summer Olympics.
 According to state news agency Agerpres, an earthquake hits the Vrancea area at 18:51 EET with an intensity of 5 degrees on the Richter magnitude scale, at a depth of 120 km. No casualties are reported.
26 January – Decree No. 11 is issued, through which some infractions are amnestied and the length of punishment for others is reduced.

February

3 February –  starts being ambassador of the Netherlands to Bucharest.
22 February – The Cuibul cu barză Church is translated.

March
2 March – A match between Steaua and the Glasgow Rangers takes place in Bucharest, ending in a score of 2-0 for Steaua.

April
6 April – Steaua plays one of the semifinals of the 1987–88 European Cup against Benfica.

May
10-14 May – Chairman of the Presidium of the Supreme Soviet, Andrei Gromyko, visits Romania.

August
28 August – President Nicolae Ceaușescu meets with Hungarian prime minister Károly Grósz in Arad.

September
23 September – At 18:19 local time, an incendiary device is thrown on the grounds of the US consulate in Bucharest. No casualties or property damage are reported.

October
5 October – Steaua plays against Sparta Prague in Bucharest during the 1988–89 European Cup, ending in a 2–2 tie.
26 October – Steaua plays against Spartak Moscow.

Births

January

9 January – Monica Ungureanu, Romanian judoka.
13 January – Daniela Dodean, Romanian table tennis player.
23 January – Alexandru Dandea, Romanian footballer.

February
8 February – Norbert Trandafir, Romanian swimmer.

March

14 March – Luminița Pișcoran, Romanian biathlete.

April

3 April – Tiberiu Dolniceanu, Romanian fencer.
12 April – Cristina Bujin, Romanian athlete.

May

4 May – Mihaela Buzărnescu, Romanian tennis player.

July
2 July – , Romanian actress.

See also
Romania at the 1988 Summer Olympics
Romania at the 1988 Winter Olympics

References

External links